

Offseason
 October 15, 1984: Jamie Quirk was released by the Indians.
 October 15, 1984: Broderick Perkins was released by the Indians.
 January 7, 1985: Butch Benton was signed as a free agent with the Cleveland Indians.
 January 9, 1985: Dave Von Ohlen was signed as a free agent by the Indians.
 March 22, 1985: Jerry Ujdur was released by the Indians.

Regular season

Season standings

Record vs. opponents

Notable transactions
 April 3, 1985: Doug Jones was signed as a free agent by the Indians.
 April 19, 1985: Benny Ayala was signed as a free agent by the Indians.
 April 23, 1985: Geno Petralli was released by the Indians.
May 7, 1985:Johnnie LeMaster was traded by the San Francisco Giants to the Cleveland Indians for Mike Jeffcoat and Luis Quiñones. Lemaster was made the starting shortstop. The previous shortstop, Julio Franco, moved to second base a position he had never played before, and Tony Bernazard benched in spite of his leading the team in home runs at the time. Bill James called these maneuvers 'strangest, most incomprehensible organizational stratagem in many years'.
May 30, 1985: Johnnie LeMaster was traded by the Cleveland Indians to the Pittsburgh Pirates for a player to be named later.
July 3, 1985: The Pittsburgh Pirates sent Scott Bailes to the Cleveland Indians to complete an earlier deal made on May 30, 1985, for Johnnie LeMaster.  
 August 1, 1985: Bert Blyleven was traded by the Indians to the Minnesota Twins for Curt Wardle, Jay Bell, Jim Weaver and a player to be named later. The Minnesota Twins completed the deal by sending Rich Yett to the Indians on September 17.

Draft picks
The Cleveland Indians drafted pitcher Mike Poehl with the ninth overall pick in the 1985 Draft.

Opening Day Lineup

Roster

Player stats

Batting
Note: G = Games played; AB = At bats; R = Runs scored; H = Hits; 2B = Doubles; 3B = Triples; HR = Home runs; RBI = Runs batted in; AVG = Batting average; SB = Stolen bases

Pitching
Note: W = Wins; L = Losses; ERA = Earned run average; G = Games pitched; GS = Games started; SV = Saves; IP = Innings pitched; R = Runs allowed; ER = Earned runs allowed; BB = Walks allowed; K = Strikeouts

Awards and honors

All-Star Game

Farm system

References

1985 Cleveland Indians at Baseball Reference
1985 Cleveland Indians at Baseball Almanac

Cleveland Guardians seasons
Cleveland Indians season
Cleve